The Terrorizers was the eighteenth novel in the Matt Helm secret agent novel series by Donald Hamilton. It was first published in 1977. Following the publication of this book, Hamilton put his longtime character on hiatus; the next Matt Helm novel, The Revengers, would not be published until 1982.

This novel was nominated for an Edgar Award.

Plot summary
Matt Helm finds himself in Canada suffering from amnesia, with only his instincts keeping him alive as the tries to regain his memory while stopping a terrorist organization.

External links
Synopsis and summary

1977 American novels
Matt Helm novels
Novels set in Canada